Singam Puli is a 2011 Indian Tamil-language action thriller film written and directed by Sai Ramani. It stars Jiiva in dual roles, co-starring Divya Spandana, Honey Rose and Santhanam. With its release delayed multiple times, the film saw a theatrical release on 4 March 2011. The film was dubbed in Telugu as Simham Puli. It opened to a mixed critical reception, and was moderately successful at the box office.

Plot
The film has a deceptively casual beginning: a middle-class family consisting of parents, a daughter and identical twin sons: Shiva and Ashok Kumar. Shiva works in a fish-market, and Ashok Kumar is a lawyer. Shiva is a typical hero who attacks baddies with his bare fists; a rugged man who will brook no injustice. Devout Ashok's goodness is a facade that hides his evil womanizing nature. Both have romantic interests. Shweta is Shiva's long-time sweetheart, while Ashok's life is one long, lustful journey as he charms every woman he meets into his bed. But Shiva can do nothing right as far as his parents are concerned; they trust Ashok and always misunderstand Shiva's righteous anger and his every attempt to show up his Machiavellian twin fails. Ashok, on the other hand, is pally with the local goons and uses his brains to assist them in their nefarious activities. Matters come to a head when Ashok lures a girl called Gayatri with false pretences, pretending to be falling in love with her at first ending up in having sex with her and eventually causing her to kill herself when he learns that she becomes pregnant.

Shiva lodges a complaint on Ashok but this fails as he could not prove that whether it was him or Ashok who did the crime due to their faces. Shiva learns that a security guard saw Ashok pushing Gayatri from the roof. He tells the guard to meet him in the evening, but the guard is killed by Ashok as the guard saw him in the evening and thought he was Shiva. Shiva learns this, a cat-and-mouse game begins between the siblings. This angers Ashok, and he tries to kill Shiva and employs a gang to do so. Eventually, Shiva learns of this plot and confronts Ashok. During the fight, Ashok is killed by his own man. Shiva walks with his father, who for the first time accepts him.

Cast

Soundtrack
All songs scored by Mani Sharma. The song "Figaru" is based on "Hare Rama" from Okkadu. The song  "Kangalal" is based on "Endhuko" from Chirutha. The song "Varrale" is based on "Parare" from Stalin.

Behindwoods.com gave the album 2 stars out of 5, noting it had "all the ingredients for a mass entertainer", and felt it "has the ability to make people dance to his (Sharma's) tunes."

Release
The film was initially set to release on Diwali 2010, but got delayed due to CG works on scenes involving Jiiva's dual roles. It got rescheduled to release on 11 February 2011. It received a U/A (parental guidance) certificate from the Central Board of Film Certification, and the release was postponed to 25 February 2011. The film was finally released on 4 March 2011.This Film was sold by Sun TV.

Critical reception
Rohit Ramachandran in nowrunning.com gave the film 3.25/5 stars stating that "Singam Puli is a passable entertaining film that is worth checking out if you're looking for popcorn escapism". Rediff wrote "This cat-and-mouse game does work, most of the time. Fewer songs and a taut climax would have made for a more exciting watch." Behindwoods wrote "For his debut project, Sai Ramani has chosen a mainstream commercial subject taking in sibling rivalry with clearly etched out characters which could have worked wonders but fortunately he had capitalized this aspect in weaving an engaging tale. The inconsistent narration meanders through the course of the film with its lumpy episodic nature that fails to have an engrossing effect on the audience." Sify wrote "Sai Ramani directed Singam Puli, is an uninspiring 2 hours 45 minutes masala film that takes the viewers for granted. The film is loaded with action, drama, fights, comedy and double meaning dialogues and crass comedy." Mid-Day wrote "Debutant Sai has chosen an advanced theme of fight between twins who represent good and bad. This could have been forgiven if he had worked up a good script to tell this tug-of-war between the brothers".

References

External links
 

2011 films
Indian action films
2011 action films
2011 masala films
Twins in Indian films
2010s Tamil-language films